Liu Zijian may refer to:

James T.C. Liu (1919–1993), Chinese-born historian
Law Choo Kiang (born 1970), Malaysian politician